Radunia Stężyca is a Polish football club based in Stężyca, Pomeranian Voivodeship. They compete in the third-tier II liga.

The club was founded in 1982. In the 2020–2021 season, Radunia was promoted to the II liga for the first time in its history. The team plays its home matches at the multipurpose stadium "Arena Radunia", which was put into use in 2017, with a capacity of 450 seats. The club also runs a reserve team that performs in the Gdańsk regional league in the 2020–2021 season and four youth groups. In the club's first season in II liga, Radunia finished 6th and qualified for the promotion playoffs.

Current squad

References

External links
  
 Radunia at 90minut.pl 

Kartuzy County
Football clubs in Poland
Association football clubs established in 1982
1982 establishments in Poland
Football clubs in Pomeranian Voivodeship